The 21st Alberta Legislative Assembly was in session from June 12, 1986, to February 20, 1989, with the membership of the assembly determined by the results of the 1986 Alberta general election held on May 8, 1986. The Legislature officially resumed on June 12, 1986, and continued until the fourth session was prorogued on February 17, 1989, and dissolved on February 20, 1989, prior to the 1989 Alberta general election on March 20, 1989.

Alberta's twentieth government was controlled by the majority Progressive Conservative Association of Alberta for the fifth time, led by Premier Don Getty. The Official Opposition was led by Ray Martin of the New Democratic Party. The Speaker was David J. Carter.

Party standings after the 21st General Election

 A party requires four seats to have official party status in the legislature. Parties with fewer than four seats are not entitled to party funding although their members will usually be permitted to sit together in the chamber.

Members elected
For complete electoral history, see individual districts

Note: 
1Nancy Betkowski later changed her last name to Nancy MacBeth.

References

Further reading

External links
Alberta Legislative Assembly
Legislative Assembly of Alberta Members Book
By-elections 1905 to present

21